Prakash Narain Tandon (born 13 August 1928) is an Indian neuroscientist and neurosurgeon.

He graduated with an MBBS and MS from the [KGMC] in 1950 and 52 respectively, and then trained at the University of London and obtained his FRCS in 1956. He further obtained specialist training in neurosurgery at  Oslo, Norway and Montreal, Canada. After a brief tenure as a professor at the K.G. Medical College, Lucknow (1963–65), he moved to the All India Institute of Medical Sciences, New Delhi where he founded the neurosurgery department he has been a professor of neurosurgery, a Bhatnagar Fellow (CSIR) and then a professor emeritus.  Tandon, an elected fellow of the National Academy of Medical Sciences, was the President of the Indian National Science Academy in 1991-92 and has been awarded Padma Shri (1973) and Padma Bhushan (1991) by the Government of India. He is also a recipient of the Lifetime Achievement Award of Madras Neuro Trust.
Tandon also serves as the president of the National Brain Research Centre Society, Manesar, Haryana, India. He is a member of the Norwegian Academy of Science and Letters. Noted neurosurgeon B. K. Misra is one of his students.

References

1928 births
Living people
Recipients of the Padma Bhushan in medicine
Recipients of the Padma Shri in medicine
Indian neurosurgeons
Indian neuroscientists
Recipients of the Padma Vibhushan in medicine
Members of the Norwegian Academy of Science and Letters
University of Lucknow alumni
Alumni of the University of London
Academic staff of the All India Institute of Medical Sciences, New Delhi
Fellows of the National Academy of Medical Sciences
20th-century Indian medical doctors
20th-century surgeons